Ebberston Hall is a Grade II* listed country house in Ebberston, North Yorkshire, England. It was built in the 18th century for William Thompson. It was subsequently inherited by Sir Charles Hotham-Thompson, 8th Baronet, followed by Beaumont Hotham, 3rd Baron Hotham. It was later purchased by George Osbaldeston, before passing into the ownership (by inheritance from his father who had acquired it in 1941) of West de Wend Fenton.

References

Country houses in North Yorkshire
Grade II* listed houses
Houses completed in the 18th century
Grade II* listed buildings in North Yorkshire